Rose Ogier (born 5 December 1955) is an international lawn bowler from Guernsey.

Bowls career
Ogier won a pairs silver medal (with Lucy Beere), at the 2019 Atlantic Bowls Championships in Cardiff. Also in 2019, she won three gold medals at the European Bowls Championships.

The following year in 2020, Ogier was selected as part of the five woman team by Guernsey for the 2020 World Outdoor Bowls Championship

In 2022, she competed in the women's pairs at the 2022 Commonwealth Games.

References

Guernsey female bowls players
Living people
1955 births
Bowls European Champions